Shuga Naija is an MTV series that highlights the lifestyle of youths from different backgrounds and education on Sex and Sexual Transmitted Disease, Health among others. The sixth season of the MTV Shuga Naija is set in metropolitan area of Lagos where people from different part of the are living as residents and some for business and employment purposes. This interesting new season comes with a lot of complications, friendship ties about to broken, families about to tier down due to secrets. The season primarily focus on educating especially young people on Sex Education, Family Planning, Contraception, HIV prevention among others. MTV Shuga is produced by produced by award-winning writer/filmmaker Chris Ihidero, and Emma Uduma of SMAT Media.

Overview 
The MTV Shuga Season 6 premiered February 22, 2018 at FilmHouse IMAX Cinema, Lekki, featuring a stellar cast and a powerful story. Starring Timini Egubson, Jemima Osunde, Rahama Sadau, Adebukola Oladipupo, Abayomi Alvin, and many new faces and with cameo performances from YCee.

Shuga Naija is regarded as Africa's most viewed youth series since its inception in 2019. New faces in season 6 are Ozzy Agu, Rahama Sadau, Amal Umar, Yakubu Muhammad, Bolanle Olukanni, Funlola Aofiyebi-Raimi, Nobert Young, Bukola Oladipupo, Alvin Abayomi, and Helena Nelson along with many more new faces. Directors of the MTV series season 6 include award-winning directors, Tolulope Ajayi, Ishaya Bako and Tope Oshin were also revealed as the directors.

MTV SHUGA Season 6 features a plot that portrays the vibrant streets, eclectic clubs along with the bustle of Lagos metropolis along with the contrasting Northern states of Kano and Kaduna regions.

Cast 
This new season features the following 26 cast members;

 Timini Egbuson as Tobi, 
 Jemima Osunde as Leila, 
 Sharon Ezeamaka as Princess 
 Olumide Oworu as Weki. 
 Adebukola Oladipupo as Faa
 Yakubu Mohammed as Mahmud
 Ozzy Agu 
 Rahama Sadau as Yasmin
 Funlola Aofiyebi 
 Nobert Young 
 Amal Umar as Hadiza
 Helena Johnson as Diana
 Ladani Sulaiman 
 Shawn Faqua
Richard Mofe Damijo as Angel 
Funlola Aofiyebi as Mrs. Olotu
Osas Ighodaro as Sergeant Iyanu
Funso Adeolu as Inspector Olotu
Mosses Akerele as Khalil
Ruby Akubueze as Frances 
Yomi Alvin as Ebisinde  
Uzoamaka Aniunoh as Cynthia
Rakiah Attah as Mahmud's mother
Omowunmi Dada as Barbie
Segun Dada as Bada
Emeka Darlington as Jasper
Riyo David as Jibril
Omozele Gabriel as Maryam
Chimezie Imo as Shina
Sharon Jatto as Simi
Emeka Nwagbaraocha as Chinedu 
Taiwo Ola as Mo 
Prince Tunde Sado as Mr. Efosa
Tomiwa Tegbe as Wasiu

References 

2018 Nigerian television seasons
MTV original programming